Xie Yanze (born 11 January 1984) is a former Chinese professional tennis player.

In her career, she won six singles and seven doubles titles on the ITF Circuit. On 7 June 2004, she reached her best singles ranking of world No. 184. On 27 September 2004, she peaked at No. 149 in the WTA doubles rankings.

In 2005, Xie along with Peng Shuai reached the semifinals at the Guangzhou International Open, losing to eventual finalists Neha Uberoi and Shikha Uberoi.

ITF Circuit finals

Singles: 16 (6 titles, 10 runner-ups)

Doubles: 13 (7 titles, 6 runner-ups)

External links
 
 
 Yan-Ze Xie at TennisLive.net
 Yanze Xie at the Tennis Channel

1986 births
Living people
Chinese female tennis players
Universiade medalists in tennis
Universiade silver medalists for China
Medalists at the 2003 Summer Universiade
21st-century Chinese women